Duke Ellington Presents... is an album by American pianist, composer and bandleader Duke Ellington recorded for the Bethlehem label in 1956.

Reception
The Allmusic review by Scott Yanow awarded the album 2½ stars and stated "Although this set is not essential, the music is quite enjoyable and it is interesting to hear Duke Ellington playing such tunes as "Laura," "My Funny Valentine," and "Indian Summer."

Track listing
All compositions by Duke Ellington except where noted
 "Summertime" (George Gershwin, Ira Gershwin, Dubose Heyward) - 2:13
 "Laura" (Johnny Mercer, David Raksin) - 4:15
 "I Can't Get Started" (Vernon Duke, Ira Gershwin) - 4:25
 "My Funny Valentine" (Lorenz Hart, Richard Rodgers) - 4:48
 "Everything But You" (Ellington, Don George, Harry James) - 2:57
 "Frustration" - 3:49
 "Cotton Tail" - 2:52
 "Day Dream" (Ellington, John Latouche, Billy Strayhorn) - 3:39
 "Deep Purple" (Peter DeRose, Mitchell Parish) - 3:36
 "Indian Summer" (Al Dubin, Victor Herbert) - 3:01
 "Blues" - 7:00

Personnel
Duke Ellington – piano
Cat Anderson, Willie Cook, Ray Nance, Clark Terry - trumpet
Quentin Jackson, Britt Woodman - trombone
John Sanders - valve trombone
Jimmy Hamilton - clarinet, tenor saxophone
Johnny Hodges - alto saxophone
Russell Procope - alto saxophone, clarinet
Paul Gonsalves - tenor saxophone
Harry Carney - baritone saxophone
Jimmy Woode - bass
Sam Woodyard - drums
Ray Nance (track 3), Jimmy Grissom (track 5) - vocal
Ray Nance (track 3) - violin

References

Bethlehem Records albums
Duke Ellington albums
1956 albums